Xi'an Beizhan station is a metro station served by Line 2, Line 4 and Line 14 of Xi'an Metro. The station opened on 16 September 2011.

References

Xi'an Metro stations
Railway stations in China opened in 2011